Miles Brown (born 4 January 1978) is an Australian theremin player, composer, multi-instrumentalist, producer, music curator and sound artist. Best known for his work with Australian instrumental electronic act The Night Terrors, Brown has also performed with Lou Reed, Laurie Anderson, Goblin, Black Mountain, Mick Harvey, Alexander Hacke, Danielle de Picciotto, Bardo Pond, Heirs and The Narcoleptor.

Biography

Brown was born in Hobart, Tasmania, and developed his practice in the experimental art rock scene of Melbourne. He is a student of Russian theremin virtuosa Lydia Kavina, the first cousin twice removed of Léon Theremin (the inventor of the instrument).

With his band The Night Terrors, Brown has explored the theremin as a lead instrument in an electronic progressive rock scenario. The Night Terrors have released three albums: Back To Zero (2009), Spiral Vortex (2014) and Pavor Nocturnus: Composition for Grand Organ, Theremin, Electronics and Percussion (2014), three EPs: The Night Terrors (2002), Lightless (2003) and Monster / Lasers For Eyes (2012), and have toured Europe and Australia with Hawkwind, Goblin, Melt-Banana, Serena-Maneesh and Black Mountain. The Night Terrors are often described as horror film soundtrack music.

Brown has also worked extensively with Australian experimental industrial band Heirs, touring Europe and Australia supporting Alcest, Primordial and Årabrot, and contributing to the records Fowl (2010) and Hunter (2011).

In May 2014 Brown was commissioned by the City of Melbourne to compose an album of music for the Melbourne Town Hall's Grand pipe organ, the largest grand romantic organ in the Southern Hemisphere. Pavor Nocturnus: Composition for Grand Organ, Theremin, Electronics and Percussion was performed by The Night Terrors, recorded on Friday the 13th of July and launched on Halloween 31 October 2014. The album was released by the label Twisted Nerve Australia, a joint imprint between Dual Planet and UK producer / music archivist Andy Votel. A special edition was released by UK cult movie soundtrack label Death Waltz Recording Company / Mondo, home to film composers such as John Carpenter, Goblin, Fabio Frizzi, Angelo Badalamenti, Steve Moore and Ennio Morricone.

Miles Brown’s debut solo album Séance Fiction was released in December 2015 on Death Waltz and It Records in Australia. His solo material explores the theremin and analogue synthesiser in the realms of dark wave, gothic disco and cosmic electronics.

In 2019 Brown debuted The Narcoleptor - his new experimental collaboration with classical harpist and vocalist Mary Doumany. The Narcoleptor's debut EP was released that year on Nosferatunes Records. 

Brown's sophomore solo album The Gateway was released by Death Waltz in 2020 to celebrate with the 100th anniversary of the theremin. The Gateway features a contemporary expansion of the classic theremin sound in the style of 'gothic sci-fi techno'. Brown plays the Moog Etherwave Pro theremin employing both its familiar heterodyne voicing and controlling analogue synthesisers via CV. 

In 2021 The Narcoleptor released their debut LP Transmogrification on Nosferatunes. The album explores the microtonal capacities of theremin, analogue electronics, post-Celtic lever harp and voice.

Discography

Solo

2020: The Gateway – Death Waltz Originals
2019: Shudder Speed (single) – Nosferatunes
2015: Séance Fiction – Death Waltz Originals / Mondo / It Records 
2014: Electrics (single) – It Records

The Night Terrors
2014: Pavor Nocturnus: Composition for Grand Organ, Theremin, Electronics and Percussion – Twisted Nerve Australia 
2014: Spiral Vortex – Homeless 
2012: Monster / Lasers For Eyes (12" EP) – OSCL / Seed Records 
2009: Back To Zero – Exo / Trendkill / Homeless 
2003: Lightless – Unstable Ape Records 
2002: The Night Terrors – Unstable Ape Records

The Narcoleptor 
2021: Transmogrification LP – Nosferatunes
2019: The Narcoleptor 12" EP – Nosferatunes

Studio Collaborations

2022: Grace Cummings – 'Fly A Kite' – Storm Queen - ATO Records
2019: Black Lung –  'NXIVM II' – NXIVM – Ant-Zen
2019: Jess Ribeiro w/ Mick Harvey – Wildflowers – Remote Control
2019: Cat Hope / Monash Art Ensemble 'The Dark Hip Falls' – Here Now Hear – FMR Records
2013: Sankt Otten – 'Mach bitte, dass es leiser wird' – Messias Maschine – Denovali
2011: Antoni Maiovvi – 'Murderfunk Night Terrors Remix' –Trial By Bullet – Seed Records
2011: Heirs – Hunter – Denovali / OSCL
2010: Heirs – Fowl – Denovali
2009: Little Birdy – Confetti – Universal Music

Film Score
2019: Volatilis (with The Narcoleptor) directed by Jenna Eriksen
2016: Dark Whispers – Volume 1 (anthology), segment: Watch Me, directed by Briony Kidd
2015: Our Extra Sensory Selves directed by Allison Gibbs – Centre for Contemporary Arts, Glasgow, UK
2015: Insomnolence, directed by Kiefer Findlow

Live Score 
2017: Crossing – with Unconscious Collective, House of Vnholy, J.P. Shilo, Alexander Hacke and Danielle de Picciotto, Dark Mofo, Tasmania.
2017: RE(PURPOSE): THE MVMNT – with Natalie Abbott, Dancehouse (Melbourne)
2015: Miles Brown & Drill Folly – The Seashell and the Clergyman directed by Germaine Dulac – Fabrica Gallery, Brighton, UK

Videos
"Speaking In Tongues" from The Gateway (2020), directed by bl00dsp0rts
"Shudder Speed" single (2019), directed by Geoffrey O'Connor
"I (excerpt)" from The Narcoleptor EP (2019), directed by Jenna Eriksen
"Feeder" from Miles Brown – Séance Fiction (2015), directed by Agostino Soldati
"Apparition" from Miles Brown – Séance Fiction (2015), directed by Agostino Soldati
"Megafauna" from The Night Terrors – Pavor Nocturnus: Composition for Grand Organ, Theremin, Electronics and Percussion (2014), directed by Agostino Soldati
"Hunter" from Heirs – Hunter (2012), directed by Brent Stegeman and Damian Coward

References

External links
Miles Brown Official Website
Miles Brown at Discogs
The Narcoleptor Official Website

Living people
Theremin players
Australian electronic musicians
Australian musicians
Musicians from Tasmania
1978 births
Australian multi-instrumentalists
People from Hobart